Almon Edward "Al" Williams (May 11, 1914 – July 19, 1969) was a Major League Baseball pitcher who played in  and  with the Philadelphia Athletics. He batted and threw right-handed.

External links

1914 births
1969 deaths
People from Morgan County, Alabama
Major League Baseball pitchers
Baseball players from Alabama
Philadelphia Athletics players